Heliothodes is a genus of moths of the family Noctuidae.

Species
The genus includes the following species:

 Heliothodes diminutivus (Grote, 1873)
 Heliothodes joaquin McDunnough, 1946

References
 Natural History Museum Lepidoptera genus database
 Heliothodes at funet

Heliothinae